Yeşilyurt is a village in the District of Gazipaşa, Antalya Province, Turkey.

References

Villages in Gazipaşa District